The Kentucky Downs Turf Sprint Stakes, raced as the FanDuel Turf Sprint Stakes is a Grade III American Thoroughbred horse race for three years old or older, over a distance of 6 furlongs on the turf held annually in September at Kentucky Downs racetrack in Franklin, Kentucky during their short turf meeting.  The event currently carries a purse of $1,000,000.

History 
The race was inaugurated in 1998 with an attractive purse offered of $100,000. The event was raced as the Kentucky Cup Turf Dash Stakes as part of the Kentucky Cup.

The event was not held in 2011 and the event renamed in 2016 to the Turf Sprint Stakes

In 2017 the event was upgraded to a Grade III.

With the influx of gaming revenue at Kentucky Downs the purse for the event has risen dramatically to nearly $700,000 offered by 2019.

Records
Speed record: 
 6 furlongs – 1:07.41 - Bran (FR)  (2022) (new track record)
  furlongs – 1:15.72 - Proforma (2018)

Margins: 
 6 lengths – Morluc (2000)

Most wins by a jockey  
 4 – Robby Albarado (2000, 2001, 2015, 2016)

Most wins by a trainer
 2 – Kenneth E. Hoffman (1998, 2001)
 2 – James A. Dodgen (2007, 2008)
 2 – Michael J. Maker (2013, 2017)
 2 – George R. Arnold II (2019, 2021)

Most wins by an owner  
 2 – Cynthia Knight (2007, 2008)

Winners

See also
 List of American and Canadian Graded races

References 

Kentucky Downs
Graded stakes races in the United States
Grade 3 stakes races in the United States
Recurring sporting events established in 1998
1998 establishments in Kentucky
Horse races in Kentucky
Turf races in the United States